AV16  may refer to:
 USS St. George (AV-16), a U.S. Navy seaplane tender of the Kenneth Whiting class.
 McDonnell Douglas AV-16, a proposed development of the AV-8A Harrier